Judge Edenfield may refer to:

Berry Avant Edenfield (1934–2015), judge of the United States District Court for the Southern District of Georgia
Newell Edenfield (1911–1981), judge of the United States District Court for the Northern District of Georgia